Millport is a town in Lamar County, Alabama, United States. It incorporated in 1887. At the 2010 census the population was 1,049, down from 1,160 in 2000. After its incorporation from 1890-1900, it was the largest town in Lamar County, losing the distinction to Sulligent. Since 1940, it has been the 3rd largest town.

Geography

Demographics

2000 census
At the 2000 census there were 1,160 people, 495 households, and 328 families living in the town. The racial makeup of the town was 65.52% White, 33.97% Black, 0.09% Native American, and 0.43% from two or more races.
Of the 495 households 28.5% had children under the age of 18 living with them, 46.1% were married couples living together, 16.4% had a female householder with no husband present, and 33.7% were non-families. 32.5% of households were one person and 15.8% were one person aged 65 or older. The average household size was 2.34 and the average family size was 2.96.

The age distribution was 24.0% under the age of 18, 8.8% from 18 to 24, 26.6% from 25 to 44, 24.1% from 45 to 64, and 16.6% 65 or older. The median age was 38 years. For every 100 females, there were 85.9 males. For every 100 females age 18 and over, there were 84.1 males.

The median household income was $26,458 and the median family income  was $33,869. Males had a median income of $30,521 versus $17,396 for females. The per capita income for the town was $12,822. About 18.2% of families and 21.0% of the population were below the poverty line, including 25.4% of those under age 18 and 28.7% of those age 65 or over.

2010 census
At the 2010 census there were 1,049 people, 453 households, and 304 families living in the town. The racial makeup of the town was 64.7% White, 33.7% Black, 0.1% Native American, and 1.3% from two or more races.
Of the 453 households 27.6% had children under the age of 18 living with them, 43.7% were married couples living together, 19.4% had a female householder with no husband present, and 32.9% were non-families. 30.9% of households were one person and 15.0% were one person aged 65 or older. The average household size was 2.32 and the average family size was 2.88.

The age distribution was 23.1% under the age of 18, 9.9% from 18 to 24, 24.0% from 25 to 44, 25.0% from 45 to 64, and 18.0% 65 or older. The median age was 39.4 years. For every 100 females, there were 83.1 males. For every 100 females age 18 and over, there were 83.9 males.

The median household income was $23,722 and the median family income  was $24,597. Males had a median income of $34,125 versus $22,153 for females. The per capita income for the town was $15,309. About 18.5% of families and 21.8% of the population were below the poverty line, including 31.7% of those under age 18 and 7.5% of those age 65 or over.

2020 census

As of the 2020 United States census, there were 1,010 people, 451 households, and 274 families residing in the town.

Government

 Mayor: Stanley Allred
 Town Clerk: Linda Ferguson
 Chief of Police: Charles White
 Fire Chief: Dale Shelley
 Attorney:  Justin G. Williams

2005 bankruptcy
Millport filed for chapter 9 bankruptcy in 2005 after mayor Waymon Fields, who was a former banker and was elected in 2004, discovered that the town  was almost $3.5 million behind in payments and was facing its water and  sewer system being taken over by the federal government because of missed payments.

Education
South Lamar School is in Millport.

Notable people
 Bill Atkins, former Auburn University and NFL player
 Mae Beavers, member of the Tennessee Senate
 Ray B. Browne, Distinguished Professor Emeritus at Bowling Green State University and founder of the academic study of popular culture in the United States

See also
 List of cities and towns in Alabama

References

External links

Towns in Lamar County, Alabama
Towns in Alabama
Government units that have filed for Chapter 9 bankruptcy